William L. Ochsenwald is an American historian and Emeritus Professor of History at Virginia Tech. He was awarded his PhD from the University of Chicago in 1971. Ochsenwald specializes in the history of the Middle East, particularly the unification of Saudi Arabia and dissolution of the Ottoman Empire. Ochsenwald has also written on Arab Muslims and the History of Palestine.

He is a regular contributor to Encyclopædia Britannica. Ochsenwald was interviewed for the 2006 documentary video Armenian Revolt, which also features David Fromkin, Norman Stone, and others.

Works
 The Middle East: A History, 7th edition (McGraw-Hill, 2011)

References

Living people
21st-century American historians
21st-century American male writers
University of Chicago alumni
Virginia Tech faculty
Year of birth missing (living people)
Place of birth missing (living people)
American male non-fiction writers